Laura Montalvo and Paola Suárez were the defending champions, but Suárez did not compete this year. Montalvo teamed up with María Emilia Salerni and lost in the quarterfinals to Silvia Farina Elia and Janette Husárová.

Amanda Coetzer and Lori McNeil won the title by defeating Nicole Arendt and Patricia Tarabini 6–7(8–10), 6–2, 6–4 in the final.

Seeds

Draw

Draw

References

External links
 Official results archive (ITF)
 Official results archive (WTA)

See also
 Brasil Tennis Cup (WTA event held from 1999 to 2002)

Brasil Open
Women's Doubles